Nathaniel Mountain Wildlife Management Area is located on  south of Romney in Hampshire County, West Virginia. The wildlife management area's principle access road is off Grassy Lick Road (County Route 10). Nathaniel Mountain is owned by the West Virginia Division of Natural Resources (WVDNR), and is one of West Virginia's largest wildlife management areas. The WMA was expanded in November 2003 after the WVDNR purchased  from the MeadWestvaco Corporation.

Nathaniel Mountain WMA is made up of three major mountains: Nathaniel Mountain, Piney Mountain, and South Branch Mountain. The WMA's forests are primarily dominated by mature species of oak, hickory, and Virginia pine. White-tailed deer, turkey, grouse, squirrel, and black bears are available for hunting.

Mill Run, a steep mountain stream that meanders through a seven-mile (11 km) course to join the South Branch Potomac River, is also located in the Nathaniel Mountain WMA.

See also

Animal conservation
Fishing
Hunting
List of West Virginia wildlife management areas

References

External links
West Virginia DNR District 2 Wildlife Management Areas
West Virginia Hunting Regulations
West Virginia Fishing Regulations
WVDNR map of Nathaniel Mountain Wildlife Management Area

Wildlife management areas of West Virginia
Protected areas of Hampshire County, West Virginia